"" is a lullaby in Māori written by Fanny Howie (also known by her stage name Princess Te Rangi Pai) in around 1907.

History
An instrumental version of "" was used from 1981 to 1994 as the New Zealand TV Channel 2's "closing-down song", which accompanied a cartoon featuring the Goodnight Kiwi.

It was the opening song on Kiri Te Kanawa's 1999 album Maori Songs. Hayley Westenra sang the song on her 2003 album Pure. The song features on the José Carreras album The José Carreras Collection. The Phoenix Foundation performed the song in the 2010 film Boy.

Lyrics

Melody

After:

References

External links
, St Joseph's Māori Girls' College
, Hayley Westenra, Teddy Tahu Rhodes

New Zealand children's songs
Māori music
Lullabies
Māori-language songs